Texas Renegades is a 1940 American Western film directed by Sam Newfield and written by Joseph O'Donnell. The film stars Tim McCoy, Nora Lane, Kenne Duncan, Lee Prather, Harry Harvey Sr. and Earl Gunn. The film was released on January 17, 1940, by Producers Releasing Corporation.

Plot
A new Marshall arrives in Rawhide. His name is Tim Smith and his mission is to fight off some rustlers. The gang attempts for his life, but get the wrong guy, Tim takes advantage of this situation to pose as an outlaw and make his way inside the gang. When the gang trusts him, they give him the job of posing as a Marshall.

Cast          
Tim McCoy as 'Silent' Tim Smith
Nora Lane as Ruth Rand
Kenne Duncan as Bill Willis 
Lee Prather as Jim Bates
Harry Harvey Sr. as Noisy
Earl Gunn as Lefty Higgins
Hal Price as Mr. Lee
Bud McClure as Tom
Joe McGuinn as Jeff
Ray Bennett as Snipe 
Buel Bryant as Murph
Arnold Clack as Lucky

References

External links
 

1940 films
American Western (genre) films
1940 Western (genre) films
Producers Releasing Corporation films
Films directed by Sam Newfield
American black-and-white films
1940s English-language films
1940s American films